Iosia Iosia (born December 28, 1991) is an American football defensive end who is currently a free agent. He played college football at West Texas A&M.

References

1991 births
Living people
American football defensive ends
Denver Broncos players
Players of American football from San Francisco
West Texas A&M Buffaloes football players